The Lac de Bracca is a small lake in the Monte Renoso massif in the Corse-du-Sud department of France.

Location

The Lac de Bracca is in the commune of Bastelica to the east of the  Punta Capanella and the  Punta all Vetta.
It is drained by Prunelli river, which flows west and then south through the Lac de Vitalaca, then southwest past the village of Bastelica and through the Lac de Tolla down to the Golfe d'Ajaccio.

Hikers can reach the lake via the Col de Scalella.
This is a steep and difficult route, recommended only for seasoned hikers.

See also

List of waterbodies of Corse-du-Sud

Notes

Sources

Lakes of Corsica